Tani may refer to:

one of the Tani languages of the Himalayas
the Maiani language of Papua New Guinea